Kenneth W. Workman (born October 12, 1948) is an American politician. He served as a Democratic member for the 51st and 56-3 district of the Georgia House of Representatives.

Life and career 
Workman was born in Fulton County, Georgia. He attended Georgia State University.

In 1981, Workman was elected to the 56-3 district of the Georgia House of Representatives, succeeding Tommy Tolbert. He left office in 1983 when he was elected to the 51st district, succeeding Mobley Childs. He served until 1989, when he was succeeded by Thurbert Baker.

References 

1948 births
Living people
People from Fulton County, Georgia
Democratic Party members of the Georgia House of Representatives
20th-century American politicians
Georgia State University alumni